"Young" is a song by American electronic music duo The Chainsmokers. A remixed version was released as the second promotional single from the duo's debut album, Memories...Do Not Open. The song appears in support of the Tommy Hilfiger Fall 2017 campaign.

Live performances
On May 21, 2017, The Chainsmokers performed "Young" at the 2017 Billboard Music Awards. They also performed the song at the 2017 Jingle Bell Ball at The O2 Arena in London on Sunday 10 December 2017.

Video
A lyric video was released in June 2017, featuring childhood pictures and baby photos along with moments captured on their recently completed Memories... Do Not Open Tour.

A 30-second clip of the video appeared at the TommyXTheChainsmokers Fall Campaign event.

Track listing

Charts

Year-end charts

Release history

Certifications

References

2017 singles
2017 songs
The Chainsmokers songs
Songs written by Andrew Taggart
Disruptor Records singles
Songs written by Peter Hanna
Songs written by Taylor Bird (songwriter)